(1925 – October 3, 2017) was a Japanese film producer and served as vice-president of Daiei Film.

Filmography 
 Brooba (1955)
 Punishment Room (1956)
 The Crowded Streetcar (1957)
 The Kiss (1957)
 The Invisible Man vs. The Human Fly (1957)
 Giants and Toys (1958)
 Kyohan sha (1958)
 Being Two Isn't Easy (1962)
 Giant Horde Beast Nezura (unfinished 1964)
 Gamera, the Giant Monster (1965)
 Gamera vs. Gyaos (1967)
 Gamera vs. Viras (1968)
 Gamera vs. Guiron (1969)
 Gamera vs. Jiger (1970)
 Gamera vs. Zigra (1971)

References

Sources

External links

Hidemasa Nagata at the Japanese Movie Database (in Japanese)

1925 births
2017 deaths
Japanese film producers
Film studio executives